Koussanar Arrondissement  is an arrondissement of the Tambacounda Department in the Tambacounda Region of Senegal.

Subdivisions
The arrondissement is divided administratively into rural communities and in turn into villages.

Arrondissements of Senegal
Tambacounda Region